Robert Kelley may refer to:
Robert Kelley (academic administrator) (born 1944), president of the University of North Dakota
Bob Kelley (1917–1966), American football and baseball broadcaster
Bob Kelley (athlete) (1897–1965), American Olympic athlete
Bob Kelley (American football) (born 1930), American football center
Robert E. Kelley (born 1933), American Air Force officer
Robert F. Kelley (1894–1976), American government official
Robert S. Kelley (1831–1890), state senator in Kansas and U.S. Marshal of the Montana Territory
Robert Kelley (American football) (born 1992), American football running back

See also
Robert Kelly (disambiguation)